The Chacoan tuco-tuco (Ctenomys dorsalis) is a species of rodent in the family Ctenomyidae. It lives in Bolivia and Paraguay.

References

Tuco-tucos
Mammals of Paraguay
Endemic fauna of Paraguay
Mammals described in 1900
Taxa named by Oldfield Thomas
Taxonomy articles created by Polbot